The Damansara Damai MRT station is a mass rapid transit (MRT) station in the suburb of Damansara Damai in Sungai Buloh, Selangor, Malaysia. It is one of the stations on the MRT Putrajaya line. It opened on 16 June 2022 under Phase One operations of the line.

Location 
The station is located along Kepong-Kuala Selangor highway .

Station layout 
Damansara Damai station is elevated with an island platform.

References

External links 
 Damansara Damai MRT station - KL MRT Website
 Klang Valley Mass Rapid Transit
 MRT Hawk-Eye View
 Development Proposal Report (LCP) for Damansara Damai station

Rapid transit stations in Selangor
Sungai Buloh-Serdang-Putrajaya Line
Railway stations opened in 2022